Zooni is an unreleased Indian Hindi-language film directed by Muzaffar Ali, starring Vinod Khanna and Dimple Kapadia. The film was in production from 1988 and was expected to release in 1990.

Plot

Zooni is a period film revolving around the sixteenth century Kashmiri poet Habba Khatoon (1554-1609 CE), queen of  Yousuf Shah Chak, the prince of Kashmir. After he was arrested by Mughal emperor Akbar and banished to Bihar, he remained to be the last ruler of Kashmir.

Cast

Vinod Khanna
Dimple Kapadia

Music
All songs were written by Shahryar.

"Allah Khair Allah Khair Maango Sab Ki" - Asha Bhosle, Jaywant Kulkarni, Sunil Kumar, Bhushan Mehta
"Allah Khair Allah Khair Maango Sab Ki" (female) - Asha Bhosle
"Jeene Ki Koi Raah Dikhayi" - Asha Bhosle
"Nazar Mein Noor Ki Shamma Jali" - Asha Bhosle
"Rookh-e-Dildar Deedam Daras Ko" - Asha Bhosle 
"Shah-e-Mardaan, Sher-e-Yajdaan" - Asha Bhosle
"Tere Bin Yeh Jeevan Kya Hai" - Asha Bhosle
"Yeh Shamme Yeh Savere Jo Hain" - Asha Bhosle 
"Husn Shaan-e-Dilbaraan Ishq" - Anuradha Paudwal
"Jheel Ke Aaine Mein Phir Mujhko" - Anwar

References

Unreleased Hindi-language films
Films directed by Muzaffar Ali
Films scored by Khayyam